USS Searcher (YAGR/AGR-4) was a , converted from a Liberty Ship, acquired by the US Navy in 1954. She was obtained from the National Defense Reserve Fleet and reconfigured as a radar picket ship and assigned to radar picket duty in the North Atlantic Ocean as part of the Distant Early Warning Line.

Construction
Searcher (YAGR-4) was laid down on 11 December 1944, under a Maritime Commission (MARCOM) contract, MC hull 2338, as the Liberty Ship James W. Wheeler, by J.A. Jones Construction, Panama City, Florida. She was launched on 23 January 1945; sponsored by Mrs. R. D. Turnage; and delivered on 5 February 1945 to the Calmar Steamship Company.

Service history
She was acquired by the Navy from the Maritime Administration on 15 September 1954 and reclassified YAGR-4 in August 1954. She was converted to a radar picket ship at the Charleston Naval Shipyard, Charleston, South Carolina, and commissioned Searcher on 2 April 1955.

Searcher departed Charleston, 16 May 1955, for Newport, Rhode Island, where, after shakedown, she reported for duty with the seaward extension of America's early warning defense system. She reported on station for her first patrol on 5 July 1955.

Fitted with sophisticated electronic search and tracking equipment, Searcher could locate, track, and report enemy aircraft at great distances, and control high-speed interceptor aircraft in event of an attack. She also carried out weather reporting duties during her three-to-four-week-long cruises.
 
On 13 November 1955, Searcher was damaged by an engine room fire which burned for six and a half hours before being extinguished with the aid of two other ships. Her patrols were otherwise uneventful. She was reclassified AGR-4 effective 28 September 1958; and, during the Cuban Missile Crisis in 1962, she operated at sea for 60 out of 67 days.

In March 1964 she lost her screw at sea while steaming in a heavy gale 450 miles ESE of Cape Cod and was later taken in tow first by the US Coast Guard Cutter Yakutat and then by a US Navy tug.

Decommissioning 
On 1 July 1965, Searcher was decommissioned, struck from the Navy List and transferred to the Maritime Administration (MARAD). She was laid up in the Hudson River Reserve Fleet until sold for scrapping on 7 August 1970, to the North American Smelting Co., Wilmington, Delaware.

Military awards and honors

Searchers crew was eligible for the following medals:
 National Defense Service Medal
 Navy Expeditionary Medal (2 awards)

See also
 United States Navy
 Radar picket

References

Bibliography

External links 
 
 

 

Liberty ships
Ships built in Panama City, Florida
1945 ships
World War II merchant ships of the United States
Guardian-class radar picket ships
Cold War auxiliary ships of the United States
James River Reserve Fleet
Wilmington Reserve Fleet
Hudson River Reserve Fleet